Voice ( also known as Whispering Corridors 4: Voice and Voice Letter) is a 2005 South Korean horror film, and the fourth installment of the Whispering Corridors film series. The film was the debut film for its three young actresses, as well as director Choi Ik-Hwan, who had served as an assistant director on the first film of the series.

It was screened at the 2006 San Francisco Korean American Film Festival.

Plot 
Young-eon (Kim Ok-bin), the top singer at an all-girls school, is murdered by a music sheet cutting her throat in the opening scene. The next day nobody can see or hear her except her friend Seon-min (Seo Ji-hye), who can only hear her. The two attempt to find out what happened to Young-eon. Seon-min begins speculating that the music teacher must have killed Young-eon. The mystery behind her death is slowly unraveled as Young-eon has flashbacks of life before her death.

Seon-min befriends a strange and lonely girl at school named Cho-ah (Cha Ye-ryun), who can hear the voices of the dead, and she helps the two solve the incident. Meanwhile, the music teacher kills herself. Seon-min begins to doubt what Young-eon says after Cho-ah tells her that ghosts only remember what they want to, meaning Young-eon's memory may be incorrect. Young-eon's body is found in on top of the elevator.

Young-eon is running out of time to discover who the other ghost is; if her friend forgets about her, she will lose her voice. Some of the flashbacks include her mother, who is in a hospital. In one flashback, she talks to her mother about how she will learn to drive when she is old enough. Another features how her mother committed suicide by jumping off the top of the hospital. In the end, Young-eon is revealed to have driven her mother to suicide, and might have multiple personality disorder due to the trauma and guilt of encouraging her mother to kill herself.  Young-eon brings tears to her music teacher's eyes when she asks the teacher to sing, leading the latter to contemplate suicide.

It turns out that Young-eon had been hearing the voices of her teacher and of the ghost, Hyo-jung, the whole time. Young-eon wanted the teacher dead to get rid of Hyo-jung's voice. Hyo-jung was a student and top singer at the school who fell in love with the music teacher. She has the same voice as Young-eon and they are both recorded in a song. Hyo-jung is revealed to have shot the music sheet at Young-eon's throat in the opening scene out of anger at losing her voice. Seon-min thinks Young-eon should move on but Young-eon is angered by her statement, since she wants nothing more than to live again. Young-eon kills Cho-ah and takes over Seon-min's body. She then walks alongside Seon-min's mother, talking about how, as soon as she is old enough, she will learn to drive.

A scene during the credits shows Cho-ah shouting in frustration, but voiceless.

Cast

Kim Ok-bin as Young-Eun
Seo Ji-hye as Seon-Min
Cha Ye-ryun as Cho-Ah
Kim Seo-hyung as Hee-Yeon
Im Hyun-Kyung as Hyo-Jung
Jeon Ji-ae as Hwa-Jung
Yoon Young as Hye-Sun
Lee Eun as Mi-Hee
Sun Joo-Yeon as Jin-Young
Won Ae-Ri as Myung-Sook
Park Yoon-Kyung as Eun-Ha
Kim Sung-Tae as Homeroom teacher 
Han Chae-Woo as Athletic teacher 
Kim Jung-young as Young-Eon's mother

References

External links 
 
 
 
 
 

2005 films
South Korean horror films
2000s Korean-language films
2005 horror films
South Korean supernatural horror films
2000s South Korean films
CJ Entertainment films
Cinema Service films